KMTB is a commercial radio station that broadcasts to the Nashville-Texarkana area on 99.5 FM. The station is licensed in Murfreesboro, Arkansas to Arklatex Radio, Inc..

External links
 Official Website
 

MTB
Radio stations established in 1983
1983 establishments in Arkansas
Country radio stations in the United States